Beipan River Bridge or Beipanjiang Bridge can refer to a number of bridges that cross the Beipan River in China.

 Duge Bridge the world's highest bridge.
 Qinglong Railway Bridge
 Beipan River Guanxing Highway Bridge world's highest bridge from 2003 to 2005
 Beipan River Shuibai Railway Bridge the world's highest railway bridge from 2001 to 2016
 Beipan River Hukun Expressway Bridge